Nausinoe geometralis is a species of moth of the family Crambidae described by Achille Guenée in 1854. It can be found in western, southern and eastern Africa, from Ghana to South Africa and some islands of the Indian Ocean as well as in Australasia, Australia and India.

Known host plants of this species are Oleaceae and Jasminum species.

References

External links
African Moths: distribution map and pictures of Nausinoe geometralis

Moths described in 1854
Spilomelinae
Moths of Africa
Moths of Madagascar
Moths of Mauritius
Moths of Réunion